This is a list about all badges of honor in Iran. The list contains badges and medals of the monarchy and government of the Qajar dynasty, Pahlavi dynasty and Government of the Islamic Republic of Iran which have special ratings and classes.

Qajar dynasty badges

The Qajar dynasty was an Iranian royal dynasty of Turkic origin, specifically from the Qajar tribe, ruling over Iran from 1789 to 1925. These badges used in the Qajar period and can be divided into two categories:

The swordsmanship badges had eight levels in the following order:

The badges were in the form of a baldric with colored ribbons, at the bottom of which a medal with the image of Lion and Sun was hung. The importance of the badge was recognized by their color. The blue colors belonged to the kings and the green colors belonged to Lords (Noyan A'zam), red to Major-generals (Amir Tumani) and Brigadier-generals (Sartippi) and white to the colonels (Sarhangi).

From another badges that used in this period include:
 Order of the effigy of Amir al-Mu'minin (Especially for Qajar kings and princes)
 Order of Aqdas in three classes:
 Order of Aqdas (Most Sacred - 1st class, Called first class Lion and Sun badge until 1893)
 Order of Qods (Very Sacred - 2nd class, Called second class Lion and Sun badge until 1893)
 Order of Moghaddas (Sacred - 3rd class, Called third class Lion and Sun badge until 1893)
 Order of the effigy of Homayoun (For First-class foreign officials)
 Order of the Crown (In two classes until 1926)
 Order of the Lion and the Sun (In 5 classes from 1893)
 Order of Aftab (For women in two classes)
 Order of Zolfaghar (Military order)
 Order of Jaladat (Military order in three classes)
 Order of Sepah (In three classes)
 Order of Science
 Order of Toopkhaneh
 Order of 10 Tumani Tala
 Order of Noghreh
 Order of Bombaran Majles
 Order of Reshadat
 Gold Order with the image of Ahmad Shah 
 Military Order of Bronze
 Order of Officers
 Gold Order for Commanders
 Orders of Mashroutiat

Badges of the Pahlavi dynasty

The Pahlavi dynasty, the last ruling house of Iran, from 1925 until 1979, used these badges:
 Order of Pahlavi (In two classes)
 Order of Zolfaghar (Military order)
 Order of AriaMehr (For the ladies of the royal family in two classes)
 Order of the Crown (In five classes)
 Order of the Pleiades (For women in three classes)
 Order Of Homayoun (In four classes)
 Order of Third Isfand (Only one class)
 Order of the Red Lion and the Sun (In five classes)
 Order of Sepah (In three classes)
 Order of Paas (In three classes)
 Order of Avicenna (For medical staff of army in three classes)
 Military Order of Merit (Military order in two types and three classes include medals)
 Order of Eftekhar (Military order in three classes)
 Military Order of Service (Military order in three classes include medals)
 Order of Splendor (For urban protection staff in three classes)
 Order of Knowledge (In three classes)
 Order of Art
 Order of Javid (For bodyguard staff)
 Order of Azarabadegan (For fighters in Azerbaijan crisis of 1946)
 Order of 28th Mordad (For fighters in 1953 Iranian coup d'état)
 Order of Effort (For urban protection staff in three classes include medals)
 Medal of Bravery (For non-military gunmen who cooperated with the army)
 Order of Three Stars of Service (For urban protection staff in three classes)
 Order of Razi (Special order of the army medical staff in two classes)
 Order of Years of Service (For urban protection staff in three classes)
 Order of Glory (For the family of the martyrs)
 Medal of Reward (For good service with special conditions)
 Medal of Corpsman (For good technical service with special conditions)
 Medal of Farr (For good service with special conditions)
 Grand Order of Tir (For best experts in shooting competitions in three classes)
 Order of Marksmanship (For championship position in shooting competitions with three types and three classes)
 Order of Sport Services (For good sport services in three classes)
 25th Anniversary of the Mohammad Reza Shah's Reign Medal (Order of Persepolis)
 2,500 Year Celebration of the Persian Empire Medal
 Coronation Commemorative Order (To commemorate the coronation day)
 Order of Rastakhiz Party (In three classes)
 Order of Land Reforms (In three classes)
 Order of Endeavor (For urban protection staff)
 Order of Cooperation (In three classes)
 Order of Tir
 Order of P.T.T. Ministry

Badges of the Islamic Republic

Government Orders of the Islamic Republic of Iran

The Government of the Islamic Republic of Iran is the ruling state and current political system in Iran, in power since the Islamic revolution and fall of the Pahlavi dynasty in 1979.

Government Orders of the Islamic Republic of Iran are state badges (country) that are awarded to qualified individuals, whether citizens of Iran or foreign nationals, in accordance with the provisions of the by-laws. The order of the "Order of Islamic Revolution" as the highest badge of the Islamic Republic of Iran is for the then President. Other badges are given by the President on the proposal of the relevant ministers and with the approval of the Council of Ministers. The badges of the Islamic Republic in order of precedence are as follows:

 A - Excellence Orders

Order of Islamic Revolution (The highest honorary order in the Islamic Republic of Iran given to the President at the ceremony of the presidential inauguration)
Order of Independence (For who playing a key role in achieving high goals of the Islamic Republic of Iran)
Order of Freedom (For who hold one of the first order of General or Expertise awards and continue to be qualified to serve the sacred aims of the Islamic system)
Order of Islamic Republic (For the heads and other officials of foreign countries, In three classes)

 B - Expertise Orders

Order of Knowledge (For individuals who have made significant and unprecedented efforts to improve the country's scientific performance, In three classes)
Order of Research (For individuals who have been the origin of fundamental transformation or rare service, In three classes)
Order of Merit and Management (For who achieve "an exceptional success in management, distinguished activities, aiding the oppressed and deprived people and/or beneficiary use of utilities and/or offering exquisite ways, In three classes)
Order of Justice (For who have contributed to the enforcement of divine decrees and the establishment of law and justice in society, In three classes)

 C - General Orders

Order of Construction (For who have made significant efforts in country's development, In three classes)
Order of Service (For who achieving distinguished success, In three classes)
Order of Work and Production (For who have achieved remarkable results in industry or agriculture, In three classes)
Order of Courage (For courage, a high characteristic of human in achieving distinguished success, In three classes)
Order of Altruism (For who have distinguished effort and self-sacrifice for the sacred aims of the Islamic system, In three classes)
Order of Education and Pedagogy (For who have demonstrated competence in educational fields, In three classes)
Order of Culture and Art (For who "facilitate theirs thinking, passions and emotions to express deep Islamic and humanitarian concepts and to spread culture", In three classes)
Order of Mehr (For women who are source of valuable works in social, economic and political affairs, In three classes)
Order of Persian Politeness (For  who have significant attributes or efforts in literary fields, In three classes)

National medals
 National Medals of Appreciation (The National Medal of Appreciation is to honor scientists who have shown significant contributions to the development of the country, In Golden and Silver classes)
 National Medals of Memorial (The National Medal of Memorial is to honor those who lost their lives defending the country, In Golden and Silver classes)

General Staff of the Armed Forces of the Islamic Republic of Iran

 Supreme Orders
 Order of Fath (For the warriors with remarkable victory, In three classes)
 Order of Nasr (For good support of the effective forces in combat services, support activities and veterans, In three classes)
 Order of Shafa (For aid workers who have risked their lives to save lives)

 General Orders
 Order of Zolfaghar (Iran's highest military order for great commanders)
 Order of Sacrifice (Awarded for courage in battles)
 Order of Veteran (Awarded for courage in battles)
 Order of Courage (Awarded for courage in battles)
 Order of Jihad (Merit and Skill award)
 Order of Glory (IRIA) (For the family of the martyrs)
 Order of Merit (IRIA) (Merit and Skill award)
 Order of Knowledge (IRIA) (Merit and Skill award)
 Order of Razi (IRIA) (Merit and Skill award)
 Order of Art (For activists of the Armed Forces in cultural and artistic affairs, In three classes)
 Order of Sport (IRIA) (For good sport services in army, Only one class)

See also
 List of national symbols of Iran
 Iranian Army Branch Insignia
 Islamic Revolutionary Guard Corps Branch Insignia
 Iranian Police Branch Insignia

References

External links
 DECORATIONS – Encyclopaedia Iranica
 Imperial Persian Orders
 Imperial Order of Aqdas
 Crown Order (Nishan-i-Taj-i-Iran)
 Order Of The Crown Of Iran (Nishan-I-Taj-I-Iran), 5th Class, Officer

Orders, decorations, and medals of Iran
Civil awards and decorations of Iran
Military awards and decorations of Iran